National Indigenous Television (NITV) is an Australian free-to-air television channel that broadcasts programming produced and presented largely by Aboriginal and Torres Strait Islander people. It includes the half-hourly nightly NITV News, with programming including other news and current affairs programmes, sports coverage, entertainment for children and adults, films and documentaries covering a range of topics. Its primary audience is Indigenous Australians, but many non-Indigenous people tune in to learn more about the history of and issues affecting the country's First Nations peoples.

NITV was initially only carried by cable and satellite providers, along with some limited over-the-air transmissions in certain remote areas. NITV was re-launched in December 2012 by the Special Broadcasting Service (SBS) as a free-to-air channel.

History

Predecessors of NITV 
Indigenous groups and individuals lobbied the Australian Government to fund a nationwide Indigenous television service in the 1980s and 1990s, however no major political party championed this cause.

In the late 1990s the Imparja Info Channel (also known as "Channel 31") was launched free-to-view on the satellite Optus Aurora service, providing largely Aboriginal programming direct to homes and via network of BRACS transmitters to remote Aboriginal communities. The Aboriginal programming on this channel later became known as Indigenous Community Television. In 2004, Imparja stated a desire to run a better funded service, at least within its license area.

In the same year, a voluntary NITV Committee was formed and a summit was held in Redfern, Sydney. The summit involved a group of Aboriginal and Torres Strait Islander media professionals and community members committed to the establishment of a national Indigenous broadcasting service.

Following an Australian Government review in 2005, the Government announced $48.5 million in funding for NITV.

Establishment 
In 2007, NITV established a head office in Alice Springs and a television arm in Sydney. On 13 July 2007 NITV launched, replacing Imparja Info Channel on Optus Aurora and in the remote Aboriginal communities it previously reached. It soon after also became available free-to-air on Optus D1 to Australia and eastern Papua New Guinea.

NITV launched on Australian subscription television services on 1 November 2007 on Foxtel and Austar's satellite service on channel 180, with it becoming available on its cable service soon after. It showed Australian programs and sports like The Marngrook Footy Show, and the annual NSW Aboriginal Rugby League Knockout.

On 27 October 2008, NITV was added to Sydney's Digital Forty-Four data-casting service on channel 40.

On 30 April 2010, NITV ceased broadcasting on Sydney's digital television Datacasting service along with other services. However, it remained available on subscription services Foxtel, Austar and Optus TV.

Under SBS 
In 2010, the Australian government commissioned a wide-ranging review of its investment in the Indigenous broadcasting and media sector. The review was headed up by retired senior public servant Neville Stevens with the assistance of Expert Panel members Laurie Patton and Kerrynne Liddle. The review recommended that NITV continue to receive government funding only on the basis that it was re-structured.

Subsequently, Communications Minister Senator Stephen Conroy invited NITV to enter in negotiations with the Special Broadcasting Service to access one of that network's unused digital terrestrial channels. On 8 May 2012, the SBS received $15 million per-year in government funding dedicated to a new free-to-air Indigenous Australian channel which would replace NITV in July 2012, with 90% of staff transferring to this new channel. SBS took over the management and operation of NITV on 1 July 2012, and NITV was re-launched on 12 December 2012 by SBS as a free-to-air channel on Freeview channel 34. The channel launched with a live special from Uluru, From the Heart of Our Nation, followed by a special episode of Living Black focusing on Indigenous broadcasting and media in Australia. A prime time Celebration Concert was also aired on NITV and SBS One, featuring performances  from Uluru by Indigenous musicians.

Tanya Denning-Orman, a Birri Gubba and Guugu Yimidhirr woman was appointed to lead NITV, a position she retains into 2021.

On 29 February 2016, SBS unveiled a refreshed brand and revamped schedule for NITV with an increased focus on its central charter, Indigenous news and current affairs.

Denning-Orman was appointed SBS's first Director of Indigenous Content in early 2012. In December 2012, changes were made to NITV's senior content editorial leadership team: Kyas Hepworth (née Sherriff) was appointed Head of Commissioning and Programming; Rhanna Collins to Head of Indigenous News and Current Affairs; Karla Grant, while remaining host of Living Black and Karla Grant Presents, will expand her role, becoming Executive Producer, Living Black & Special Projects.

On 12 December 2021, NITV unveiled an updated logo and branding by indigenous design agency Gilimbaa, which combines SBS's mercator logo with traditional clapsticks, and colors reflecting different terrains of the country. It was accompanied by revisions to its primetime schedule, as well as the new image campaign "Reimagine Australia". The following year, NITV marked its tenth anniversary as a free-to-air channel.

Programming

NITV's line-up focuses on programming of interest to and showcasing indigenous Australians, such as documentaries, current affairs programs, sports, drama, adult animation and a block of domestic and international children's programming focusing on Indigenous and Aboriginal culture (under the name Jarjums), and films. It also broadcasts programs relating to First Nations culture worldwide.

News and current affairs
News and current affairs on NITV are covered by NITV News, Nula and The Point. In December 2020, Rhanna Collins was promoted to Head of Indigenous News and Current Affairs. The Point'''s audience rose significantly during the 2020 Black Lives Matter movement.NITV News is the network's national half-hour news program, broadcast nightly and covering stories relating to Aboriginal and Torres Strait Islander viewers. It is the only nightly television news service that covers entirely Aboriginal and Torres Strait Islander stories from across the country. Started in February 2008, the program began with 5 minutes of news, followed by 15 minutes before finally extending to a half-hour bulletin.

Natalie Ahmat is the news anchor.

Other programs
 Volumz is a music show hosted by Alec Doomadgee, highlighting the best of the Australian Indigenous music scene. It was produced from 2011 to 2012. 
In March 2020, a new australian rules panel show, Yokayi Footy, aimed at a young audience, replaced the Marngrook Footy Show, which was axed in late 2019. It is co-hosted by Tony Armstrong, Bianca Hunt and Darryl White.

Programs in 2018–2019 included:
 First Voices Future Dreaming Going Places with Ernie Dingo Little J and Big Cuz Living Black Over The Black Dot Yokayi Footy''

See also

 WITBN

References

External links

Special Broadcasting Service
Indigenous Australian television
Television channels and stations established in 2007
English-language television stations in Australia
Mass media in Alice Springs
2007 establishments in Australia

2007 Australian television series debuts
2010s Australian television series
Australian television news shows
Digital Forty Four